New Middletown is the name of several towns in the United States:

New Middletown, Indiana
New Middletown, Ohio